"Can't Get Enough of Your Love, Babe" is a song written, recorded, and produced by American musician Barry White. Released in June 1974 as the first single from his third album, Can't Get Enough (1974), the song topped the US Billboard Hot 100 and Billboard R&B charts and has since become one of his signature tunes. It was his second US chart-topper, after "Love's Theme". It became a gold record in the US. White performed this song live on The Midnight Special in 1974, and on Soul Train on May 24, 1975.

Charts

Weekly charts

Year-end charts

Certifications

Taylor Dayne version

In 1993, the song was covered by American singer, songwriter, and actress Taylor Dayne as "Can't Get Enough of Your Love". When Dayne submitted her planned third album to Arista Records, label president Clive Davis strongly suggested that she remake the Barry White classic to serve as the album's lead single (replacing Dayne's choice, the self-penned "I'll Wait" which was the planned title cut; the album's title was amended to Soul Dancing).

Produced by David Cole and Robert Clivillés of C+C Music Factory, Dayne's "Can't Get Enough of Your Love" became a US dance club hit, peaking at number two on the Billboard Hot Dance Club Songs chart. However, the track evinced a sharp drop in Dayne's profile on the Billboard Hot 100 with a number 20 peak; Dayne's first seven singles had all reached the top 10 but her eighth single, "Heart of Stone", peaked at number 12. "Can't Get Enough of Your Love" was her final top 40 hit with the follow-up single, "Send Me a Lover", being her last Hot 100 entry.

The track had more impact for Dayne internationally. In Australia, it spent three weeks at number two in August 1993 and was the 19th-best-selling single of 1993, receiving a Platinum certification for sales of at least 70,000 copies. The song also reached number eight in Canada, where it was the 67th-best-selling single of the year. Elsewhere, the song reached the top 20 in Belgium, Iceland, Ireland, the Netherlands, Switzerland, and the United Kingdom.

Critical reception
Jose F. Promis from AllMusic complimented Dayne's cover version as "excellent" and "dance-lite". Larry Flick from Billboard wrote, "Long-absent pop dynamo takes a page from Barry White's book of R&B/disco classics, and gives it a faithful reading. Her boisterous delivery occasionally overpowers the instrumentation, though she is ultimately quite effective in conjuring up feelings of nostalgia." Dave Obee from Calgary Herald remarked that "she even makes a Barry White song sound masculine." Troy J. Augusto from Cashbox described it as a "bouncy cut that recalls, of all things, '70s disco but does so with enough of the singer's powerful presence to cancel the questionable musical vibe." He added that the song's approach "is lighter than writer Barry White's original, orchestrated version but strong delivery from Dayne makes up for lack of depth otherwise apparent in this read of tune."

Nick Krewen from The Hamilton Spectator said her remake "is strong enough to claim ownership". Connie Johnson from Los Angeles Times felt that here, Dayne "does her one better, with a campy, deluxe version" of White's song. In his weekly UK chart commentary, James Masterton wrote, that "summery soul being the order of the day and may well give her her first Top 20 hit for 5 years." James Hamilton from Music Week'''s RM Dance Update viewed it as "soulful". Mike Joyce from The Washington Post found that Dayne's update of the disco classic "proves disarming."    

Music video
A music video was produced to promote the single, featuring Dayne performing in the middle of a dancing crowd of people. The video was later published on Dayne's official YouTube channel in October 2009, and had generated more than 5.2 million views as of February 2023.

Track listing
 "Can't Get Enough of Your Love" (album version) – 4:25
 "Can't Get Enough of Your Love" (C+C extended club mix I) – 6:05
 "Can't Get Enough of Your Love" (C+C extended club mix II) – 6:46
 "Can't Get Enough of Your Love" (C+C special edition mix) – 6:12
 "Let's Spend the Night Together" – 5:35

Charts

Weekly charts

Year-end charts

Certifications

Release history

Other versions
In 1983, the song was covered by Big Tony. It was a big hit in several European countries.

In popular culture

 The Barry White recording was featured in the films Cookie (1989), Blast from the Past (1999), Down to You (2000), National Security (2003), Win a Date with Tad Hamilton! (2004), Robots (2005) and 16 Blocks (2006), where the song appeared on the soundtrack and, in the film, was heard during the closing credits. It additionally appears in a 2019 Applebee's commercial, as well as Good Boys The song appears in several episodes of the Fox TV series The Simpsons, including "Whacking Day" (April 29, 1993) and "The Last Temptation of Homer" (December 9, 1993). White was a big fan of the series. He recorded a version specially for "Whacking Day", in which he also appeared as a guest star.
 In 1993, Dayne's version made an appearance in season one, episode three of The Nanny, "My Fair Nanny", playing in the background during the later part of Maggie's party.
 The song is used on the sitcoms What I Like About You (S01E03) and It's Always Sunny in Philadelphia (S10E02).
 The song also appears on the original motion picture soundtrack for the 1996 film Beautiful Girls, performed by the band Afghan Whigs.
 The opening part of the song was also heard several times in Friends'' in the episode, "The One with Ross and Monica's Cousin".
 The song is featured in the rehearsal dinner scene in the Netflix movie You People.

References

External links
 List of cover versions of "Can't Get Enough of Your Love, Babe" at SecondHandSongs.com

1974 singles
1993 singles
Barry White songs
Taylor Dayne songs
KWS (band) songs
Billboard Hot 100 number-one singles
Cashbox number-one singles
Song recordings produced by Robert Clivillés
Songs written by Barry White
20th Century Fox Records singles
Arista Records singles
Philips Records singles
1974 songs